The Vistula Spit canal (official name Nowy Świat ship canal) is a canal across the Polish section of the Vistula Spit that creates a second connection between the Vistula Lagoon and Gulf of Gdańsk. It allows ships to enter the Vistula Lagoon and the port of Elbląg without having to rely on the Russian Strait of Baltiysk, saving a 100 km journey. Its construction started in February 2019. It is 1305 m in length and allows ships of draft up to 4 m, length up to 100 m, and beam up to 20 m. 

The canal was officially inaugurated on 17 September 2022. Further works will continue.

The canal is located between the villages of Skowronki and Przebrno, at the site of an abandoned settlement called Nowy Świat, hence its official name.

Works

The major works include:
Construction of the breakwater forebay on the Gdańsk Bay side, using 10,000 concrete blocks.
Construction of the shipping channel together with all its infrastructure, including locks
New roads and two swing bridges
Construction of an artificial island in the Vistula Lagoon.

The works started in February 2019 with tree cutting, which was finished during 15-20 February 2019. Logging and branch removal was to be finished by the end of March.

The beginning of the construction of the artificial island was announced on 30 May 2020. Its area is planned to be about 180 hectares and it is expected to be a bird habitat. Its tentative name is the Aestian Island, selected by a poll and to be formally approved.

The first of two bridges over the canal, the southern one, was completed in June 2021. It is on the way connecting Krynica Morska and Stegna.

Costs

A contract was signed with a Polish-Belgium consortium in October 2019 to build the canal at a cost of PLN 992m (EUR230m). The total cost of the project is expected to be PLN 2 billion.

Concerns

The Russian Federation strongly objected to the canal on both environmental and security grounds, claiming that since the canal will allow NATO warships to enter the Vistula lagoon without passing near the Russian military facilities at Baltiysk, this presents a direct threat to the security of Kaliningrad and the Russian Federation as a whole.

Environmental concerns had been expressed by environmental activists in Europe and Poland, which did not stop the project. 

Marine biologist Dr. Agata Błaszczyk expresses the concern associated with the phosphorus accumulated in the sediments at the bottom of the lagoon, primarily coming from technical wastewaters from industries in the area of Elbląg, from animal farming sewage, and from the washed-out fertilizers, which contributes of eutrophication of the nearly closed lagoon resulting in strong blooms of cyanobacteria, which in their turn contribute to algal blooms in the lagoon giving it a distinct greenish color compared with the rest of the Baltic sea. The new waterway is expected to contribute to the mobility of the sediments, possibly resulting in changes in the ecology of the adjacent areas of Baltic Sea with unknown consequences. The concern is that the cyanobacteria in the lagoon are different from those in the open sea, with higher toxicity.

References

External links

YouTube videos on the Vistula Spit canal:
"The Vistula Spit canal and its geopolitical consequences| Captain (N)  Dariusz R. Bugajski" (in Polish) Retrieved 2023-03-11.
Przekop Mierzei Wiślanej 23.01.2020  [The Dig on the Vistula Spit 23.01.2020],  Żuławy TV
Youtube search for "Przekop Mierzei Wiślanej "

Canals in Poland
Landforms of Pomeranian Voivodeship
Baltic Sea
Vistula basin
2022 establishments in Poland